Wait For You is an EP released by Melbourne band The Basics. It was released on May 21, 2010 on CD format, and from online services such as iTunes. The EP contains 4 tracks recorded live at The Corner in 2009.

Track listing
"Wait For You" – 3:37
"I Could Be Happy" – 3:58
"Get Me Down" – 5:27
"Happy Birthday" – 0:44
"Second Best" – 5:23
"Rattle My Chain" – 3:43
"Cocaine" – 6:10

External links
Review by Rave Magazine
Review by WatchOutFor.com

The Basics albums
2010 EPs
Self-released EPs